Phucocoetes is a monospecific genus of marine ray-finned fish belonging to the family Zoarcidae, the eelpouts. Its only species is Phucocoetes latitans which is found in the southwestern Atlantic Ocean off Argentina and the Falkland Islands.

References

Lycodinae
Fish described in 1842
Monotypic ray-finned fish genera